The Polish People's Army (LWP) constituted the second formation of the Polish Armed Forces in the East in 1943–1945, and in 1945–1989 the armed forces of the Polish communist state (from 1952, the Polish People's Republic), ruled by the Polish Workers' Party and then the Polish United Workers' Party. The communist-led Polish armed forces, allowed and facilitated by Joseph Stalin, were the result of efforts made in the early 1940s in the Soviet Union by Wanda Wasilewska and Zygmunt Berling.

The official name of those formations were: Armia Polska w ZSRR (Polish Army in the USSR) from 1943–1944, Wojsko Polskie (Polish Troops) and Siły Zbrojne Rzeczpospolitej Polskiej (Armed Forces of the Republic of Poland) from 1944–1952 and from 1952 Siły Zbrojne Polskiej Rzeczypospolitej Ludowej (Armed Forces of the Polish People's Republic). On 7 October 1950, the anniversary of the Battle of Lenino was declared the official "Day of the Polish People's Army" by the authorities of the People's Republic.

History

World War II

What became the LWP was formed during World War II, in May 1943, as the 1st Tadeusz Kościuszko Infantry Division, which developed into the First Polish Army, unofficially known as Berling's Army. Because of the shortage of Polish officers and the policies of the Soviet Union, in March 1945 Soviet Red Army officers accounted for nearly 52% of the officer corps (15,492 out of 29,372). Around 4,600 of them remained in the LWP by July 1946.

It was not the only Polish formation that fought on the Allied side, nor the first one formed in the East. The earlier Polish force formed in the Soviet Union, known as Anders' Army, was loyal to the Polish government-in-exile and by that time had moved to Iran. The communist-led Polish forces soon grew beyond the 1st Division into two major commands – the First Polish Army (initially under Zygmunt Berling) and the Second Polish Army (commanded by Karol Świerczewski). The First Polish Army participated in the Vistula–Oder Offensive, the Battle of Kolberg and the final Battle of Berlin.

Immediate post-war years

After the war the Polish Army was reorganized into six (later seven) military districts. These were the Warsaw Military District, headquartered (HQ) in Warsaw, the Lublin Military District, HQ in Lublin, the Kraków Military District, HQ in Kraków, the Łódź Military District, HQ in Łódź, the Poznań Military District, HQ in Poznań, the Pomeranian Military District, HQ in Toruń, and the Silesian Military District, HQ in Katowice.

In the late 1940s and early 1950s, the Polish Army was under the command of Marshal of the Soviet Union, Marshal of Poland and Minister of Defense of Poland Konstantin Rokossovsky. It was increasingly integrated into Soviet military structure and organization. This process was mitigated in the aftermath of the Polish October of 1956, when Władysław Gomułka formalized aspects of Poland's military relationship with the Soviet Union. The Sovietization of the armed forces structure was phrased out altogether and thus the combat and service support structures were integrated once more into regular combat formations following the old Polish model.

Cold War

An anti-Zionist purge in the Polish Army took place in 1968 to systematically remove soldiers of Jewish origin, following the Six-Day War between Israel and Arab countries.

Characteristics

Uniform
In 1949, the first fundamental uniform reform after the war was made. The "Dress Rules for the Soldiers of the Polish Army" were introduced and were to apply from January 1, 1951.

In the Polish People's Army, a soft field cap modeled on the pre-war one was introduced. After the war, the pre-war garrison caps were used again. Stiffened caps were only worn until around 1950 when they were completely replaced by round caps. In 1982, the Polish Rogatywka, modeled on the pattern from 1935, were restored in the Polish Army's Representative Company.

Chaplaincy
Throughout the entire period of the existence of the Polish People's Army, its officers and soldiers were provided with pastoral care. Such a service was provided by the General Dean's Office of the Polish Army.

Training

In the 1980s, the Polish People's Republic had 4 military academies and 11 higher officers' schools, which trained auxiliary corpsmen and corresponded in rank to higher educational institutions. In 1954, judo instructors from the Warsaw and Kraków institutes of physical culture, participated in the training program for border guards and military personnel of the airborne units of the Polish army.

Engagements
 Battle of Lenino -  1943
 Battle of Studzianki - 1944
 Vistula-Oder offensive - 1945
 Battle of Kolberg - 1945
 Battle of Bautzen - 1945
 Battle of Berlin - 1945
 Anti-communist resistance in Poland (1944–1946)
 Operation Vistula - 1947
 Poznań protests of 1956
 Warsaw Pact invasion of Czechoslovakia - 1968
 Polish protests of 1970
 Pacification of Wujek - 1981
 Martial law in Poland (13 December 1981 – 22 July 1983)

See also
 Air Force of the Polish Army
 Polish Armed Forces
 Polish Armed Forces (Second Polish Republic)
 Main Directorate of Information of the Polish Army (GZI WP)
 Internal Military Service (WSW)
 Border Protection Troops (WOP)
 Polish Legions (Napoleonic period)
 Polish Military Organisation
 Armia Ludowa
 Gwardia Ludowa
 Polish forces in the West
 Polish forces in the East
 Anders' Army
 First Polish Army (1944–1945)

References

Military history of Poland
Poland–Soviet Union relations
Polish Land Forces
Polish People's Republic
Military units and formations established in 1943
Warsaw Pact
Disbanded armies
Military units and formations of the Cold War